Washington at Verplanck's Point is a full-length portrait in oil painted in 1790 by the American artist John Trumbull of General George Washington at Verplanck's Point on the North River in New York during the American Revolutionary War. The background depicts the September 14, 1782 review of Continental Army troops Washington staged there as an honor for the departing French commander Comte de Rochambeau and his army.

The painting was a gift from Trumbull to the president's wife, Martha Washington, and is now owned by the Winterthur Museum. Trumbull next received a commission from the City of New York and painted a much larger version, George Washington, with a new background, Evacuation Day of New York City, November 25, 1783, the return of Washington and the departure of British forces. It is on display in the Governor's Room of New York City Hall.

Description
General George Washington is in full military uniform, a blue coat over buff waistcoat and pants. He is standing in front of his white horse, Blueskin, leaning on the saddle and holding the reins. Seen through the legs of the horse is a romanticized depiction of Washington's September 14, 1782 display of his Continental Army troops in honor of the Comte de Rochambeau, commander in chief of the French Expeditionary Force which had marched with him earlier to Yorktown, Virginia and, with the support of a French fleet lying offshore, helped force the October 19, 1781 surrender of British general Cornwallis and bring about a peace.

Upon Rochambeau's return north almost a full year later, Washington staged a formal review of his troops at their encampment Verplanck's Point on the North River (today's Hudson) by the Comte. It was an honor due "his Excellency" both for his aid during the war and generosity in distributing to the Continental force arms, equipment, and clothing provided by France and captured by them from the British at Yorktown, as well as a thanks to the nation of France for its military assistance in winning the Colonies their freedom. Stony Point and the Hudson Highlands are also visible on the horizon.

History
The painting was a gift to Martha Washington by Trumbull. After her death, the portrait was bequeathed to her granddaughter, Elizabeth Parke Custis Law. It remained in the family until sold in 1961 to Henry Francis du Pont who then donated it to his museum in 1964. In 1982, the Mount Vernon Ladies' Association purchased a modern copy of the painting by Adrian Lamb for display at Mount Vernon.

Critical reception
Martha Washington's grandson, George Washington Parke Custis, wrote in his Recollections and Private Memoirs of Washington that:

Legacy
In 1889, for the centennial celebration of the inauguration of Washington as the first President of the United States, the original portrait, then owned by Edmund Law Rogers, grandson of Elizabeth Parke Custis Law, and the second, the city hall version, were on display together at the Metropolitan Opera House, New York City.

In 1982, a silver coin with a 30 dollar value was issued for Antigua & Barbuda commemorating the 250th anniversary of Washington's birth with this image of him at Verplanck's Point on the reverse side.

In 2017, Philip Mead, chief historian at the Museum of the American Revolution in Philadelphia, and museum curators found that a watercolor panorama by Pierre Charles L'Enfant was of this 1782 encampment at Verplanck's Point and included Washington's canvas marquee tent. R. Scott Stephenson, director of curatorial affairs at the museum, has stated that although the tent is not seen in Trumbull's painting, "because of this new watercolor and the research we've done, we can tell it shows Washington standing right in front of the tent."

George Washington

In July, 1790, Trumbull received a commission from the corporation for the City of New York, led by Mayor Richard Varick, to paint the president's portrait.

The result, George Washington, was a scaling-up of Washington at Verplanck's Point to nearly four times its size. Also known as Washington and the Departure of the British Garrison from New York City, it is a ( x ) full-length portrait in oil, generally similar in composition and character to its source but for its backdrop, which has been switched from Rochambeau's September 1782 review of the Continental Army to Evacuation Day, Washington's return to New York City upon the British forces' November 25, 1783 departure.

This painting is located in the historic Governor's Room of New York City Hall.

Notes

See also
 General George Washington at Trenton – full-length portrait painted in 1792 by Trumbull

References

External links
  Owner: Henry Francis du Pont Winterthur Museum
  Owner: City of New York
 

Paintings by John Trumbull
18th-century portraits
Paintings about the American Revolution
George Washington in art
1790 paintings
New York (state) in the American Revolution
Portraits of politicians
Horses in art
Collections of the Winterthur Museum, Garden and Library